Lindaconus is a subgenus of sea snails, marine gastropod mollusks in the genus Conus, family Conidae, the cone snails and their allies.

In the latest classification of the family Conidae by Puillandre N., Duda T.F., Meyer C., Olivera B.M. & Bouchet P. (2015), LIndaconus has become a subgenus of Conus as Conus (Lindaconus) Petuch, 2002  (type species: Conus lindae Petuch, 1987) represented as Conus Linnaeus, 1758

Species
The following species are alternate representation:
 Lindaconus bahamensis (Vink & Röckel, 1995): synonym of Conus (Lindaconus) bahamensis Vink & Röckel, 1995 represented as Conus bahamensis Vink & Röckel, 1995
 Lindaconus lindae (Petuch, 1987): synonym of Conus (Lindaconus) lindae Petuch, 1987 represented as Conus lindae Petuch, 1987
 Lindaconus spurius (Gmelin, 1791): synonym of Conus (Lindaconus) spurius Gmelin, 1791 represented as Conus spurius Gmelin, 1791
 Lindaconus spurius baylei (Jousseaume, 1872): synonym of Conus spurius baylei Jousseaume, 1872 
 Lindaconus therriaulti Petuch, 2013: synonym of Conus (Lindaconus) therriaulti (Petuch, 2013) represented as Conus therriaulti (Petuch, 2013)

References

External links
 To World Register of Marine Species

Conidae
Gastropod subgenera